German submarine U-455 was a Type VIIC U-boat built for Nazi Germany's Kriegsmarine for service during World War II.
She was laid down on 3 September 1940, launched on 21 June 1941 and commissioned on 21 August with Kapitänleutnant Hans-Heinrich Giessler in command of a crew of 51.

Her service began with the 5th U-boat Flotilla, a training outfit. She was transferred to the 7th flotilla for operations at the beginning of 1942 and again to the 29th flotilla in March 1944.

She was lost, probably in the Ligurian Sea (north of Corsica), on 5 April 1944. Her wreck was discovered in 2005, off Genoa. She had previously been thought to be near La Spezia.

Design
German Type VIIC submarines were preceded by the shorter Type VIIB submarines. U-455 had a displacement of  when at the surface and  while submerged. She had two shafts and two  propellers.

U-455 was fitted with five  torpedo tubes (four fitted at the bow and one at the stern), fourteen torpedoes, one  SK C/35 naval gun, (220 rounds), one  Flak M42 and two  C/30 anti-aircraft guns. The boat had a complement of between forty-four and sixty.

Service history

First, second and third patrols
U-455s operational career began when she left Kiel on 15 January 1942. Her first patrol took her to Iceland via Stavanger and Bergen in Norway. She returned to Bergen, empty-handed, on 28 February 1942.

The boat's second patrol was similarly unproductive, leaving Bergen on 21 March 1942 and arriving in St. Nazaire in occupied France on the 30th. She would continue to use this port for most of the rest of her career.

Her third foray was better; on 3 May 1942, she sank the British Workman off Cape Race, Newfoundland, followed by the Geo H. Jones on 11 June northeast of the Azores. Having departed St. Nazaire on 16 April 1942, she returned on 16 June, having spent 62 days at sea.

Fourth and fifth patrols
Her fourth patrol was even longer, it took her as far as the US Georgia coast, southeast of Savannah. She returned to St. Nazaire on 28 October 1942, having commenced the voyage on 22 August, a total of 68 days.

Her fifth patrol started on 24 November 1942; she scoured large swathes of the Atlantic, all to no avail.

Sixth, seventh, eighth and ninth patrols
Success continued to elude her; the only excitement on her sixth patrol was when a crewman was injured by one of the boat's own AA guns.

Things became even more serious on her eighth patrol. With a new captain, Kptlt. The smaller boats escaped, but U-460 was sunk.

Her ninth foray saw the U-boat transit the heavily defended Strait of Gibraltar into the Mediterranean Sea, leaving St. Nazaire on 6 January 1944 and arriving in Toulon on 3 February.

Tenth patrol and loss
On 5 April 1944, U-455 was lost with all hands, sunk by a mine. The German navy did not provide the sub's captain with their latest minefield maps and U-455 was driven straight into a German minefield. The boat was likely at periscope depth, since the observation mast was deployed. Her diesel mechanic Luke Brauer, who had served on-board up to patrol 9 but transferred to the naval academy before her last mission, confirmed her identity during a sea exploration in 2008. Her last transmission was on 2 April 1944, four days prior to her disappearance, when she radioed-in while on patrol off the coast of Algiers.

Wolfpacks
U-455 took part in six wolfpacks, namely:
 Hecht (27 January – 4 February 1942) 
 Pfadfinder (21 – 27 May 1942) 
 Draufgänger (29 November – 11 December 1942) 
 Ungestüm (11 – 30 December 1942) 
 Without name (11 – 23 July 1943) 
 Schlieffen (14 October 1943)

Summary of raiding history

References

Bibliography

External links

U-455 - Auf den Spuren eines U-Boots 

World War II submarines of Germany
U-boats sunk by mines
1941 ships
U-boats commissioned in 1941
Ships built in Kiel
U-boats sunk in 1944
World War II shipwrecks in the Mediterranean Sea
German Type VIIC submarines
Maritime incidents in April 1944